Fort Charlotte is a parliamentary constituency represented in the House of Assembly of the Bahamas created in 1967. It elects one Member of Parliament (MP) using a First past the post electoral system. It has been held by the Progressive Liberal Party (PLP) since 2021 and has Alfred Sears as its MP for the second nonconsecutive time.

Boundaries
The constituency encompasses Chippingham (where its namesake Fort Charlotte is located) and Arawak Cay on the northern coast of New Providence. It is bordered by Killarney to the west and downtown Nassau to the east. It is one of the smallest constituencies.

Members of Parliament

Elections

References

Constituencies of the Bahamas
Constituencies established in 1967